Sawayajpur  is a small town in Hardoi district in the Indian state of Uttar Pradesh.

Geography
It has an average elevation of 142 metres (465 feet). It is around 50 km away from hardoi, 150 km away from lucknow the capital of Uttar Pradesh and is an important tehsil of the district Hardoi.

Demographics
 India census, Sawayajpur had a population of 23,543.

References

Cities and towns in Hardoi district